Taradevi railway station is a small railway station in the Shimla district in the Indian state of Himachal Pradesh. The station lies on UNESCO World Heritage Site Kalka–Shimla Railway.  The station is located at an altitude of 1,849 metres (6066 ft) above mean sea level, 8 km from Shimla and 81 km from Kalka.It has allotted the railway code of TVI under the jurisdiction of Ambala railway division.

The name derives from Mata Tara Devi. The Sankat Mochan and Tara Devi temples are situated near this station. The third longest tunnel (No.91) at 992 metres (3,255 ft) is situated on the Shimla end of this station.

Major trains 

 Kalka Shimla NG Passenger
 Kalka Shimla Rail Motor
 Shivalik Deluxe Express
 Shimla Kalka Passenger

See also
 Barog railway station
 Shimla railway station
 Kalka railway station
 Chandigarh Junction railway station

References

Railway stations in Shimla district
Ambala railway division
Mountain railways in India

British-era buildings in Himachal Pradesh